Iliokali  (before 1927: Μορκιούς - Morkious) is a village in the municipal unit of Pamvotida, Ioannina regional unit, Greece. It is situated at the foot of the mountain Driskos, southeast of Lake Ioannina. In 2011 its population was 524.  The Egnatia Odos motorway (Thessaloniki - Ioannina - Igoumenitsa) passes northwest of the village. Iliokali is 4 km southeast of Kastritsa and 11 km southeast of Ioannina, NNW. The village has around 3,300 ha of land and is built in forests with many springs. It took its present name from the nearby Iliokali Monastery. Its inhabitants are mainly engaged in agriculture (livestock) and construction. It is known for its traditionally distilled tsipouro.

Population

See also

List of settlements in the Ioannina regional unit

External links
Official Website
Local Website
Iliokali at the GTP Travel Pages

References

Populated places in Ioannina (regional unit)